Warren Barkley English (May 1, 1840 – January 9, 1913) was an American politician who served one year as a United States representative from California from 1894 to 1895.

Biography
Born in Charles Town, Virginia (now West Virginia), he attended the public schools and Charles Town Academy until June 1861. He served in the Confederate Army during the American Civil War and after the war moved to Oakland, California where he attended the California Military Academy.

English was elected a member of the board of supervisors of Contra Costa County in 1877 and served four years. He was elected State senator in 1882 and was named a delegate to the Democratic National Convention in 1884.

His brother, William D. English sought the 1890 Democratic nomination for governor of California. The California Democratic State Convention was controlled by San Francisco Boss, Christopher Buckley. Buckley secured the nomination for San Francisco Mayor Edward B. Pond over Alameda County's favorite son, W.D. English.
Pond would go on to lose to Henry Markham in the general election.

Warren English successfully contested as a Democrat the election of Samuel G. Hilborn to the Fifty-third Congress and took his seat April 4, 1894, serving until March 3, 1895.  He was unsuccessful candidate for reelection in 1894 to the Fifty-fourth Congress.  After leaving Congress, he engaged in the real estate business in Oakland. In 1905, he moved to Sonoma County, California where he engaged in viticulture. He died in Santa Rosa, California in 1913 and was buried in Mountain View Cemetery, Oakland, California.

References
 Retrieved on 2008-10-19
Join California Warren B. English

1840 births
1913 deaths
People from Charles Town, West Virginia
Confederate States Army soldiers
People of West Virginia in the American Civil War
County supervisors in California
Democratic Party California state senators
Democratic Party members of the United States House of Representatives from California
People from Contra Costa County, California
People from Sonoma County, California
19th-century American politicians
Burials at Mountain View Cemetery (Oakland, California)